= Night box =

20th century British postal infrastructure

Night boxes were a service of post office boxes offered by the British Post Office at some major sorting offices during the inter-war years. Such boxes were available to callers to collect mail during the night hours when the boxes were normally closed to callers, at double the rent of normal boxes. Letters to such boxes had to be sent in red envelopes clearly marked "Special Private Box Night Delivery".
